The seventh season of I'm a Celebrity...Get Me Out of Here was commissioned by Network 10 in May 2020.
It launched on 3 January 2021 and was hosted by Julia Morris and Chris Brown. The season was the first to be pre-recorded and filmed in Australia, instead of its usual production location in South Africa, as a result of the COVID-19 pandemic. Filming occurred over four weeks in November and December 2020, with a live grand finale airing on 31 January 2021.

Teaser
The first teaser trailer was released on 4 November 2020. A second trailer, featuring hosts Chris Brown and Julia Morris in a variety of Australian movie parodies, was released on 13 November 2020.

Celebrities
Celebrity chef and former My Kitchen Rules judge Pete Evans was intended to be a contestant, but was dropped from the show following controversial social media posts, including one that featured the neo-Nazi symbol known as the Black Sun.

Celebrity guests

Results and elimination
 Indicates that the celebrity received the most votes from the public
 Indicates that the celebrity was immune from the elimination challenge
 Indicates that the celebrity was named as being in the bottom 2 or 3.
  Indicates that the celebrity came last in a challenge and was evicted immediately (no bottom three)
  Indicates that the celebrity withdrew from the competition

Tucker Trials
The contestants take part in daily trials to earn food. These trials aim to test both physical and mental abilities. Success is usually determined by the number of stars collected during the trial, with each star representing a meal earned by the winning contestant for their camp mates.

 The trial was compulsory and the celebrities did not decide who took part 
 The contestants were chosen by the evicted celebrities
 The voting for the trial was of dual origin

Notes
 Alli was automatically placed in the Hellevator trial as she was an intruder.
 Adam and Symon, as intruders, had to complete the Crude Oil trial as part of their entry into the camp.
 Adam and Abbie won 7 stars, although Abbie was offered a bonus star if she was able to remember all the images on the memorisation board. She correctly named all the items and won the star.
 The celebrities won 3 stars but Dr Chris Brown offered to participate in the trial to win them the full slate of stars as it was the camp's final night.

Star count

Secret Missions
This is a challenge in which celebrities have to take part in without alerting the other celebrities to what they are doing. If they are successful in the 'mission', they are rewarded.

Grant's Secret Mission: Quiet as a Mouse
Grant had to dress up as a mouse and wear squeaky shoes while carrying a cheese platter to his bed in camp. If he could avoid the camp's suspicions, by keeping his squeaking quiet, he would be allowed to eat the cheese, biscuits and grapes on the platter.

Dipper's Secret Mission: Makeup for Spices
Dipper was given a series of tasks from the Tok Tokkie. The tasks involved wearing makeup and interacting with the other campmates without getting caught to win spices.

 Blush — Offering a campmate a cup of tea
 Eyeshadow — Hugging another campmate
 Lipstick — Interact with three different campmates

Dipper failed his first mission, after Abbie noticed his blush, meaning the camp didn't win chilli. He remained undetected in the second and third missions, winning mixed herbs and salt & pepper for his campmates.

Jess' Secret Mission: Secret Cave
Jess had to recruit a campmate and find the entrance to a secret cave which could be opened using the code words "open sesame seeds" without being noticed or followed. Jess chose Travis and when they entered the cave, they found two cheeseburgers. After eating the burgers, they found out they had to recruit a third campmate, so they chose Toni and found french fries when they returned to the cave. The reward for winning the mission were delivered McDonald's meals for lunch.

Alli's Secret Mission: Secret Selfie
In episode 12, Alli was given a phone in the Tok Tokki and had to take one selfie with each of her campmates without them noticing. She succeeded in the challenge and won cups of hot chocolate for the camp.

Toni's Secret Mission: News Headlines
In episode 15, Toni was given a number of newspaper headlines and had to make them happen. They included accusing Jess of farting, telling a boring story to at least three people and burning Abbie's sock. As a reward for completing the mission, she won popcorn, butter and salt for the camp.

Team Captains

Ratings

Ratings data is from OzTAM and represents the live and same day average viewership from the 5 largest Australian metropolitan centres (Sydney, Melbourne, Brisbane, Perth and Adelaide).

References

07
2021 Australian television seasons
Television series impacted by the COVID-19 pandemic